The 1996 U.S. 500 was a CART race at the Michigan International Speedway on May 26, 1996. It was the sixth round of the 1996 IndyCar season, and ran on the same day as the 1996 Indianapolis 500, which was the premier event on the 1996 Indy Racing League calendar.

On December 18, 1995, CART teams, convinced that they were being deliberately locked out from the 1996 Indy 500, and the victims of a "power grab" by Tony George, announced their intentions to boycott the event. They jointly announced plans for a new race, the Inaugural U.S. 500, to be held at Michigan International Speedway the same day.

The official reaction from IMS/IRL was one of disappointment and dismay, suggesting that CART was preparing to do considerable damage to Indy car racing. CART participants were convinced of the opposite.

Background

Tony George, owner of the Indianapolis Motor Speedway, formed the Indy Racing League as an alternative to CART. While the Indianapolis 500 had continued to be sanctioned by the United States Auto Club (USAC) since the formation of CART in 1979, CART teams and drivers represented the vast majority of the Indy field, and USAC had taken steps to ensure that the technical specifications for Indy did not preclude CART teams from participating. In 1996, however, following his creation of the IRL, George stipulated that 25 of the 33 starting positions at Indy would be reserved for the top 25 cars which ran events in his series. This move created potential scheduling conflicts with CART-sanctioned events.

Interpreting this policy as a lockout of CART teams, the CART board agreed to stage the U.S. 500 at an alternative venue on Memorial Day weekend, the traditional date for the Indianapolis 500. George, on the other hand, viewed the refusal of CART teams to compete for the remaining eight positions on the Indy grid as a walkout/boycott.

While the Indianapolis 500 has a history of one-off participants (teams and drivers who participate in only the single race and not in other series events), the field for the U.S. 500 were comprised almost exclusively of teams and drivers who participated in the full CART season, as CART was formed of franchises owned by the various team owners, which formed the organization in 1978.  CART franchise owners were required to field teams for all races. The only extra entry was a second car for Bettenhausen Racing for Gary Bettenhausen.

Timeline
CART officially announces the inaugural running of the U.S. 500 on December 18, 1995, at a press conference in Chicago. The Indianapolis Motor Speedway immediately released a reaction expressing its disappointment of CART in what it called a "negative impact on automobile racing.
On March 4, 1996, a total of twelve corporate sponsors were announced for the U.S. 500. In addition, telephone orders through Ticketmaster began offering tickets to the event.
On March 20, 1996, ticket sales for the event were attempted to be boosted by a "doubleheader" ticket for the U.S. 500 and the CART event at Detroit on June 9.
Despite CART's efforts to broadcast the race on network TV, ESPN was chosen in March to air the race. In addition, instead of being able to broadcast directly against the Indianapolis 500, the event had to be scheduled for 2p.m. Eastern Daylight Time, two hours after the start at Indy. CART had attempted to lure NBC or Fox, but neither deal came through. Fox wanted to show the race in primetime, which would have flatly defeated the purpose of racing the same day as the Indy 500, and in fact would have conflicted with the broadcast of the race with that of the Coca-Cola 600 on TBS instead.
On April 25, 1996, it was announced that the Vanderbilt Cup would be recreated and awarded to the winner of the U.S. 500.

Qualifying

CART scheduled what was billed as a "Special Qualifying Session" for the U.S. 500 on the weekend of May 11–12, 1996. Cold temperatures and reported snow flurries hampered the session at Michigan, although it was completed as scheduled.

The move was exclusive in that all other CART events featured qualifying the same weekend of the race. Qualifying directly conflicted with the first weekend of qualifying for the Indianapolis 500. The move effectively prevented teams potentially competing at both events from having hopes of qualifying for the pole position at both races. Jimmy Vasser had a time of 31.031 seconds and the pole. Adrian Fernandez and Bryan Herta started alongside him at the first row. Teams would return two weeks later for the race.

Race

Before the start
At turn 4, a major crash happened, as Jimmy Vasser started a major pileup after colliding with Fernandez and Herta. Other drivers like Eddie Lawson, André Ribeiro, Gil de Ferran, Maurício Gugelmin, Parker Johnstone and Fredrik Ekblom were involved. The red flag was out, all the drivers who were involved, except Fernandez, took their spare cars. The Mexican driver did not restart. Though ten cars had wrecked out, CART allowed teams to bring out backup cars and make repairs to heavily-damaged cars; this hurt the credibility of CART for allowing what normally would have been DNFs to come back out as though nothing had happened. Years earlier Roberto Guerrero, the polesitter for the 1992 Indianapolis 500, crashed on the pace lap and was ruled a DNF.

Second start – Lap 67
After a delay of 1 hour and 1 minute, the race started again. At the second start, Bryan Herta was slow and Jimmy Vasser had a huge lead at the time of the 2nd start. At the 2nd lap, 2nd caution came out, as Scott Pruett had a blown engine. He retired. At lap 4, the top 6 was: Vasser, Alex Zanardi, Al Unser Jr., Emerson Fittipaldi, Michael Andretti and Paul Tracy. Restart came out at the 8th lap. But 3 laps later, another caution was out after Fredrik Ekblom had engine problems. He retired. At lap 15, restart came out. Zanardi was the new leader at lap 18. Another caution came out, as some debris were on the track, at the 23rd lap. The top 6 was: Zanardi, Vasser, Andretti, Robby Gordon, Maurício Gugelmin and André Ribeiro. Restart came out at lap 28, with Gugelmin leading the field. At lap 67, Andretti was out after mechanical problems. Caution came out once again. But the restart came just a few lap later.

Lap 84 – Lap 168
Another caution happened as Gary Bettenhausen crashed at turn 4 at lap 84. He retired. Restart came out at lap 97. At lap 109, after 3 pitstops in just a few laps, Robby Gordon retired. At lap 125, halfway through, Alex Zanardi was the race leader. 6th caution came out at lap 128, as Team Rahal driver-owner Bobby Rahal crashed at turn 2. He retired because his right-front suspension was very damaged. Restart happened at lap 132, with Zanardi leading the rest of the field, but the restart did not happen, as André Ribeiro was relocated to the lead lap, and Eddie Lawson lost one lap. Restart happened again at lap 139. The 8th caution of the day came out at lap 145 as Jeff Krosnoff retired after having an engine problems. Restart came out at lap 168, with Parker Johnstone leading the field.

Closing stages: last 75 laps
With 75 laps to go, Alex Zanardi retired after a blown engine. With this retirement came the 9th caution of the day. With 73 laps to go, top 6 were: Parker Johnstone, Jimmy Vasser, André Ribeiro, Mark Blundell, Bryan Herta and Greg Moore. Restart came out with 66 laps to go. With 37 laps to go, Johnstone was out of fuel and retired. 10th caution. 9 laps later, restart came out, with André Ribeiro leading the field after pitstops. With 26 laps to go, Greg Moore had a blown engine and retired. He was in 2nd place. Five laps later, restart was out. With 10 laps to go, Ribeiro had a mechanical problem and lost his lead to Jimmy Vasser, who won the race. In addition, an American flag was waved along with the twin checkered flags to end the race.

Post Race
With the victory, Vasser won over $1 million and had his likeness inscribed onto the Vanderbilt Cup.

Results

Race results

 C Chassis: E=Eagle, L=Lola, P=Penske, R=Reynard
 E Engine: F=Cosworth-Ford, H=Honda, MB=Ilmor Mercedes-Benz, T=Toyota
 T Tire: F=Firestone, G=Goodyear

Standings after the race
Drivers' Championship standings

References

Us 500, 1996
Us 500, 1996
Michigan Indy 400